The Hudson Brothers were an American music group from Portland, Oregon, United States, who released numerous singles and albums under the names the New Yorkers, the Hudson Brothers, Everyday Hudson, and Hudson. The group was formed in 1965 by brothers Bill Hudson, Mark Hudson, and Brett Hudson. Their discography includes six studio albums, one compilation album, and 24 singles.

Established while the three brothers were still teenagers, the group released a series of 45 RPM singles in the mid and late-1960s under the group name The New Yorkers (based on the Chrysler New Yorker automobile), including a cover of Harry Nilsson's "I Guess the Lord Must Be in New York City" in 1969. In 1970, they released the single "Laugh, Funny Funny" as Everyday Hudson, before releasing their debut album, Hudson, in 1972 through Playboy Records; this album was released under their surname alone.

After being signed to Elton John's label The Rocket Record Company by producer Bernie Taupin in 1973, the group changed their name to the Hudson Brothers, releasing the albums Hollywood Situation and Ba-Fa (1975). Their single "So You Are a Star" from Hollywood Situation was their most commercially successful hit, peaking on the Billboard 100 at number 21, and on the Canadian RPM chart at number 5. Their appearances on the Sonny & Cher show and their own short-lived variety hour, The Hudson Brothers Show, afforded them further fame as teen idols. In 1978, they released the album The Truth About Us through Arista Records, followed by their final studio album, Damn Those Kids, credited as Hudson and released by Elektra in 1980.

Albums

Studio albums

Compilations

Singles

References

Discographies of American artists
Pop music group discographies